"No One (Can Ever Change My Mind)" is a song by Swiss recording artist Stefanie Heinzmann. It was written by Marek Pompetzki, Paul NZA, and Alice Gernandt, while production was overseen by Pompetzki and NZA. The song was released as the first single from Heinzmann's second studio album, Roots to Grow. The song was re-recorded in Simlish, a fictional language used in the bestselling video game franchise The Sims, and included in The Sims 3: World Adventures.

Charts

Weekly charts

References

External links
  
 

2009 singles
2009 songs
Stefanie Heinzmann songs
Songs written by Ace Wilder